The Perry Township Schools serves Perry Township, Marion County, Indiana, United States, a southern part of the city of Indianapolis.

Alternative schools
James Whitcomb Riley Alternative Education
Rise Learning Center

Elementary schools
Abraham Lincoln Elementary
Homecroft Elementary
Southport Elementary
Douglas MacArthur Elementary
Mary Bryan Elementary
Winchester Village Elementary
Clinton Young Elementary
Henry Burkhart Elementary
Glenns Valley Elementary
Rosa Parks Elementary
Jeremiah Gray Elementary

Middle schools
Perry 6th Grade Academy 
Perry Meridian Middle 
Southport 6th Grade Academy 
Southport Middle

High schools
Perry Meridian High School 
Southport High School

External links

 

Education in Indianapolis
Perry Township